Scandosorbus intermedia, the Swedish whitebeam,  is a species of whitebeam found in southern Sweden, with scattered occurrences in Estonia, Latvia, easternmost Denmark (Bornholm), the far southwest of Finland,  and northern Poland.

Description

It is a medium-sized deciduous tree growing to 10–20 m tall with a stout trunk usually up to 60 cm, but sometimes as much as 2–3 m diameter, and grey bark; the crown is dome-shaped, with stout horizontal branches. The leaves are green above, and densely hairy with pale grey-white hairs beneath, 7–12 cm long and 5–7 cm broad, with four to seven oval lobes on each side of the leaf, broadest near the middle, rounded at the apex, and finely serrated margins. The autumn colour is dull yellowish to grey-brown. The flowers are 15–20 mm diameter, with five white petals and 20 yellowish-white stamens; they are produced in corymbs 8–12 cm diameter in late spring. The fruit is an oval pome 15 mm long and 10 mm diameter, orange-red to red, maturing in mid autumn. The fruit is dryish, and eaten by thrushes and waxwings, which disperse the seeds.

Sorbus intermedia is a triple hybrid between S. aucuparia,  S. torminalis, and either S. aria or one of its close relatives. It is closely related to Sorbus hybrida (Finnish whitebeam), another species of hybrid origin, which differs in having the leaves more deeply lobed, with the basal two pairs cut right to the midrib as separate leaflets. Both are tetraploid apomictic species which breed true without pollination.

Habitat, cultivation and uses
In the Nordic countries, the tree typically grows in forests, pastures or forest edges.

It is widely grown as an ornamental tree in northern Europe, valued for its tolerance of urban street conditions; it is very commonly used in avenues and urban parks. It is frequently naturalised in the British Isles. In recent years, much new planting of "Swedish whitebeam" has actually been of the related Sorbus mougeotii (Vosges whitebeam), another apomictic species from further south in Europe that has more erect branching, less deeply lobed leaves with whiter undersides to the leaves, and darker red fruit.

References

External links
 Sorbus intermedia - information, genetic conservation units and related resources. European Forest Genetic Resources Programme (EUFORGEN)

intermedia
Plant nothospecies